Bhaavageete or Bhavageeth (literally 'emotion poetry') is a form of poetry and pop music in India. Most of the poetry sung in this genre pertain to subjects like love, nature and philosophy, and the genre itself is not much different from Ghazals, though ghazals are bound to a peculiar metre. This genre is quite popular in Karnataka and Maharashtra. This genre may be called by different names in other languages.

Kannada Bhavageete
Kannada Bhavageete draws from modern Kannada poetry.

Notable modern Kannada poets whose works have been set to music include Kuvempu, D. R. Bendre, Gopalakrishna Adiga, K.S. Narasimhaswamy, G.S. Shivarudrappa, K. S. Nissar Ahmed, Raju Ananthaswami.

Popular Bhavageetes in Kannada

 Tanuvu ninnadu, manavu ninnadu - Kuvempu
 Anandamaya ee jagahrudaya - Kuvempu
 Oh nanna chetana - Kuvempu
 Ealladaru Iru - Kuvempu
 Baa Chakori - Kuvempu
 Yaava Mohana Murali Kareyitu - Gopalakrishna Adiga
 Ede tumbi haadidenu andu naanu baavartha - G.S. Shivarudrappa
 Ondu munjaavinali - Chennaveera Kanavi
 Ee dinantha samayadali - K. S. Nissar Ahmed
 Jogada siri belakinalli - K. S. Nissar Ahmed
 Kaanada kadalige - G. S. Shivarudrappa
 Rayaru bandaru mavana manege - K. S. Narasimhaswamy
 Deepavu ninnade gaaliyu ninnade - K. S. Narasimhaswamy
 Amma naanu devaraane - H. S. Venkateshamurthy
 Baa illi sambhavisu - Kuvempu
 Ello hudukide illada devara - G. S. Shivarudrappa
 Naakutanti - aavu eevina - D. R. Bendre
 Ilidu baa taayi - D. R. Bendre
 Nee hinge nodabeda - D.R. Bendre
 Mugila Maarige Raaga Ratiya - D.R. Bendre
 Ee Banu Ee Chukki - H. S. Venkateshamurthy

Marathi Bhavageet
Marathi Bhavageet (Marathi:भावगीत) draws from Marathi language poetry.

Notable composers/performers/singers include Hridaynath Mangeshkar, Lata Mangeshkar, Asha Bhosle, Sudhir Phadke, Arun Date, and Suman Kalyanpur.

Poets include Suresh Bhat (who made Marathi ghazals popular) and Shanta Shelke.

Popular Marathi Bhavageet
 Shukratara - Arun Date
 Ya Janmavar - Arun Date
 Swargangechya Kathavarti  - Arun Date
 Bhatukalichya Khelamadhali - Arun Date
 Hee Waat Door Jate - Asha Bhosle
 Chandane Shimpit Jaashi - Asha Bhosle
 Toch Chandrama Nabhaat - Sudhir Phadke
 Mawalatya Dinakara - Lata Mangeshkar
 Asa Bebhan Ha Wara - Lata Mangeshkar
 Tinhi Sanja SakheF Milalaya - Lata Mangeshkar
 Pratima Uri Dharuni - Lata Mangeshkar
 Airanichya Deva Tula - Lata Mangeshkar
 Rimjhim Jharati Shravan Dhara - Suman Kalyanpur
 Shabda Shabda Japuni Thewa - Suman Kalyanpur
 Omkar Pradhan Roop Ganeshache - Suman Kalyanpur
 Keshava Madhava - Suman Kalyanpur
 Ketakichya Bani Tithe - Suman Kalyanpur
 Jithe Sagara Dharani Milate - Suman Kalyanpur
 Naavika Re Wara Wahe Re - Suman Kalyanpur
 Nakalat Saare Ghadale - Suman Kalyanpur
 Waat ithe Swapnatil - Suman Kalyanpur

See also
Natya Sangeet

Indian styles of music
Kannada poetry
Marathi-language literature
Marathi music